"No One Needs to Know" is a song co-written and recorded by Canadian country music artist Shania Twain.  It was released in May 1996 as the sixth single from her second studio  album The Woman in Me (1995). The song was written by Twain and Robert John "Mutt" Lange. The song became Twain's third consecutive number-one hit on country radio, and fourth overall. It spent one week at the top of the chart in July 1996. It was originally released to radio in May 1996.  The song was also used in the 1996 film Twister and included on the soundtrack. Twain composed the song while working and performing at the Deerhurst Resort in Huntsville, Ontario, Canada.

Critical reception
Billboard reviewed the single favorably, calling it "an infectious concoction that boasts a lighter, fresher sound than her previous outings". They also stated that the "harmonica-accented production has a cool kind of retro feel" which "should help her sell a few more records".

Music video
The music video for "No One Needs to Know" was filmed in Spring Hill, Tennessee, and directed by Steven Goldmann. It was filmed on April 3, 1996, and released on May 15, 1996, on CMT. The video consists of Twain and a backing band playing at a rather large farm house, while a tornado (filmed by Charles Robertson) arrives, coinciding with the theme of the Twister movie. One version of the video contains scenes from the movie, while another, the 'Performance Only' version is just of Twain and the band. The 'Performance Only' version of the video is available on Twain's DVD The Platinum Collection. Both videos start with a brief "rehearsal", during which Twain gives instructions to the band, they play a few bars and Twain mixes up the lyrics.

Chart performance 
"No One Needs to Know" debuted on the Billboard Hot Country Singles & Tracks chart the week of May 11, 1996, at number 62. The song spent 20 weeks on the chart and climbed to a peak position of number one on July 13, 1996, where it remained for one week. The single became Twain's fourth number-one single (third consecutive), fourth Top 10 single, and sixth consecutive Top 20 single. "No One Needs to Know" became Twain's fastest climbing single to reach number one when it did so in ten weeks, a record previously held by both "Any Man of Mine" and "You Win My Love" when they made number-one in eleven weeks.

Charts

Year-end charts

Notes

1996 singles
1995 songs
Shania Twain songs
Songs written by Robert John "Mutt" Lange
Song recordings produced by Robert John "Mutt" Lange
Songs written by Shania Twain
Mercury Records singles
Mercury Nashville singles
Music videos directed by Steven Goldmann